The A.K. Steunenberg House in Caldwell, Idaho, is a 2-story Colonial Revival expansion by Tourtellotte & Co. in 1904 of a smaller Queen Anne house. The 1904 renovation established a 2-story, round corner tower and a colonnade with three prominent columns marking the Kimball Street exposure. The original house at the northwest corner of North 4th and Kimball Streets may have been occupied by the Steunenbergs as early as 1890.

Albert K. Steunenberg
The A.K. Steunenberg House was the property of Albert and Carrie Steunenberg, both of Iowa. Albert K. Steunenberg (September 11, 1863-March 16, 1907) with his brother, Frank Steunenberg (August 8, 1861-December 30, 1905), were publishers of The Caldwell Tribune from 1886 until 1893. Al Steunenberg was active in fraternal organizations and helped to found the Caldwell Commercial Bank, later the Caldwell Bank and Trust Co., serving as the bank's cashier.

References

External links
 
 Steunenberg Residence, Idaho Meanderings

Further reading
 Albert K. Steunenberg, An Illustrated History of the State of Idaho (Lewis Publishing Co., 1899), pp 221

		
National Register of Historic Places in Canyon County, Idaho
Queen Anne architecture in Idaho
Late 19th and Early 20th Century American Movements architecture
Houses completed in 1904
Caldwell, Idaho